Hyde Park station may refer to:

 Hyde Park station (Los Angeles Metro), in Los Angeles, California, United States
 Hyde Park station (MBTA), in Boston, Massachusetts, United States
 Hyde Park station (New York Central Railroad), in Hyde Park, New York, United States
 Hyde Park Corner tube station, in London, England
 51st–53rd Street (Hyde Park) station, in Chicago, Illinois, United States